Eucosmophora prolata is a moth of the family Gracillariidae. It is known from Venezuela.

The length of the forewings is 3.7 mm for females.

The larvae probably feed on a Sapotaceae species and probably mine the leaves of their host plant.

Etymology
The specific epithet is derived from the Latin prolatus (meaning extended, elongated), in reference to the unusually long antenna of this species.

References

Acrocercopinae
Moths described in 2005